Karin A. Orvis is a U.S. government official who has been appointed to become the Chief Statistician of the United States in May, 2022. She will be in charge of the Statistical Policy Branch of the Office of Information and Regulatory Affairs.

Career
Orvis earned a Ph.D. in industrial and organizational psychology from George Mason University, and a college degree in psychology from Michigan State University. She was an assistant professor at Old Dominion University. She held several Department of Defense positions including the Directorship of the Transition to Veterans Program Office, which supports military service members as they become veterans, and return to civilian life. She was appointed to be the Director of the Defense Suicide Prevention Office in 2019. In April 2022 she was appointed to be Chief Statistician of the U.S.

References 

George Mason University alumni
Living people
Michigan State University alumni
United States government officials
Year of birth missing (living people)